Bananogmius is an extinct genus of ray-finned fish that lived in what is today Kansas during the Late Cretaceous. It lived in the Western Interior Seaway, which split North America in two during the Late Cretaceous.

Description
As with many plethodids, Bananogmius had a thin body reminiscent of the modern angelfish, dozens of small teeth, and an extremely high dorsal fin.

References

External links
http://www.nationalgeographic.com/seamonsters/timeline/#bananogmius

Tselfatiiformes
Prehistoric ray-finned fish genera
Late Cretaceous fish of North America
Fossils of the United States
Natural history of Kansas
Cretaceous bony fish
Fossil taxa described in 1940
Mooreville Chalk